Slatina nad Úpou is a municipality and village in Náchod District in the Hradec Králové Region of the Czech Republic. It has about 300 inhabitants. It lies on the Úpa River.

References

Villages in Náchod District